Swords to ploughshares (or plowshares) is a concept in which military weapons or technologies are converted for peaceful civilian applications.

The phrase originates from the Book of Isaiah chapter 2:

The ploughshare ( ’êṯ, also translated coulter) is often used to symbolize creative tools that benefit humankind, as opposed to destructive tools of war, symbolized by the sword ( ḥereḇ), a similar sharp metal tool with an arguably opposite use.

In addition to the original Biblical Messianic intent, the expression "beat swords into ploughshares" has been used by disparate social and political groups.

An ongoing example as of 2013 is the dismantling of nuclear weapons and the use of their contents as fuel in civilian electric power stations, the Megatons to Megawatts Program. Nuclear fission development, originally accelerated for World War II weapons needs, has been applied to many civilian purposes since its use at Hiroshima and Nagasaki, including electricity and radiopharmaceutical production.

Biblical references

Beyond the above usage in the Book of Isaiah, this analogy is used twice more in the Old Testament/Tanakh, in both directions:

An expression of this concept can be seen in a bronze statue in the United Nations garden called Let Us Beat Swords into Plowshares, a gift from the Soviet Union sculpted by Evgeniy Vuchetich, representing the figure of a man hammering a sword into the shape of a plowshare.

Confucianism
James Legge's translation of Analects of Confucius includes a story of Confucius asking his disciples to list their aims, resulting in praise for the virtue of Yan Hui:

Practical applications
 After World War II, military surplus AFVs were sometimes converted into bulldozers, agricultural, and logging tractors, as seen in the American television series Axe Men. Two are currently preserved at the Swords and Ploughshares Museum in Canada. French farmers sometimes used modified versions of the obsolete FT-17 tank, and similar vehicles, based on the T-34 tank, remain in widespread use in the former USSR. A British agricultural engineer and collector of classic tractors, owns a Sherman tank that was adapted to plow Lincolnshire's fields in response to the shortage of crawler tractors.
 From the 1970s onward, several anti-war musicians play guitars made from military surplus weapons. Jamaican reggae star Pete Tosh famously owned a Fender Stratocaster built around an M-16 rifle. In the present day the Escopetarra, a guitar converted from the AK-47, is the signature instrument of César López, Souriya Sunshine, and Sami Lopakka of the Finnish death metal band Sentenced.
 Nitrogen mustard, developed from the chemical weapon mustard gas developed in World War I, became the basis for the world's first chemotherapy drug, mustine, developed through the 1940s.
 Peaceful nuclear explosions, the application of nuclear detonations to civilian applications such as excavation and mining, explored by the USA (Project Plowshare) and USSR (Nuclear Explosions for the National Economy). However, the nuclear fallout and other contamination produced quickly rendered such programs impractical.
 Swedish aid organization IM Swedish Development Partner launched Humanium Metal, using metal from illegal handguns to create everyday objects. The first product announced was headphones by Yevo.
 The Global Positioning System was originally developed to enable more accurate strikes with long-range weapons by the United States, but its purpose was later expanded to include civilian applications such as personal navigation assistants.
 The Plowshares movement (British, Christian, founded by Daniel Berrigan), Trident Ploughshares (British) and Pitstop Ploughshares (US, Christian) are peace movements, inspired by the book of Isaiah, in which participants attempt to damage or destroy modern weapons, such as nuclear missiles.
The Megatons to Megawatts Program, agreed to in 1993 by the United States and Russia, successfully converted 500 metric tonnes of fuel from Soviet-era nuclear warheads into fuel for nuclear power plants over a period of 20 years.

In political and popular culture
 The Starry Plough, a flag associated with revolutionary Irish republicanism and socialism, features a sword as the plowshare.
 Twelve-term US Congressman and three-time presidential candidate Ron Paul wrote a book entitled Swords into Plowshares: A Life in Wartime and a Future of Peace and Prosperity, in which he discusses growing up during World War II and living his life through war after war.
 In his farewell address, U.S. President Dwight Eisenhower, when speaking about the military–industrial complex, stated:

 For his first and second inaugurations, U.S. President Richard Nixon took the oath of office with his hand on two family Bibles, opened to Isaiah 2:2–4.
 In their speeches at the signing of the 1979 Egypt–Israel peace treaty, Jimmy Carter, Anwar Sadat, and Menachem Begin all referenced the saying in calling for peace.
 In Ronald Reagan's address to the 42nd Session of the United Nations General Assembly in New York, New York.

 The song "Ashes In Your Mouth" by Megadeth uses a reference to plows and shear to swords:

The popular anti-war song "The Vine and Fig Tree" from the Greenham Common Women's Peace Camp Songbook repeats the verse

 The song "The End of the Innocence" by Don Henley (1989) uses the Joel inverted version of the phrase:

 "Heal the World" by Michael Jackson (1991):

 Finale of the musical Les Misérables:

 The name of a card in Magic: The Gathering, a popular trading card game.
 A poem by Israeli poet Yehuda Amichai:

 Guns into Plowshares, a sculpture by Mennonite artists Esther Augsburger and Michael Augsburger

See also

Anti-war movement
Atomic gardening
Atoms for Peace
Escopetarra
Guns vs butter
Project Plowshare
Plowshares movement

References

Book of Isaiah
Christian nonviolence
Hebrew Bible words and phrases
Judaism and peace
Military logistics
Military technology
Christian pacifism
Book of Micah